Astaroth (also Ashtaroth, Astarot and Asteroth), in demonology, was known to be the Great Duke of Hell in the first hierarchy with Beelzebub and Lucifer; he was part of the evil trinity. He is known to be a male (or female) figure most likely named after the Near Eastern goddess Astarte.

Background
The name Astaroth was ultimately derived from that of 2nd millennium BC Phoenician goddess Astarte, an equivalent of the Babylonian Ishtar, and the earlier Sumerian Inanna. She is mentioned in the Hebrew Bible in the forms Ashtoreth (singular) and Ashtaroth (plural, in reference to multiple statues of it). This latter form was directly transliterated in the early Greek and Latin versions of the Bible, where it was less apparent that it had been a plural feminine in Hebrew.

Appearances in literature
The name "Astaroth" as a male demon is first seen in The Book of Abramelin, purportedly written in Hebrew c. 1458, and recurred in most occult grimoires of the following centuries. Astaroth also features as an archdemon associated with the Qliphoth (adverse forces) according to later Kabbalistic texts, as he rules over the Qlipha of Jupiter, known as Gha'agsheblah.

Dutch demonologist Johann Weyer also described Astaroth in his Pseudomonarchia Daemonum (1577) thus: "Astaroth is a great and a strong duke, coming forth in the shape of a foul angel, sitting upon an infernal dragon, and carrying on his left hand a viper", who also claimed to rule 40 legions. Also, he had to be approached by the conjurer with a magical ring on account of his stinking breath. He is similarly referred to in the 17th-century work The Lesser Key of Solomon. He also makes an appearance in the notorious "Grimorium Verum" (True Grimoire), as the infernal principality which rules the Americas.

According to some demonologists of the 16th century, August is the month during which this demon's attacks against man are stronger. According to Sebastien Michaelis, he is a demon of the First Hierarchy, who seduces by means of laziness, self-doubt, and rationalized philosophies. His adversary is St. Bartholomew, who can protect against him for he has resisted Astaroth's "temptations". To others, he teaches mathematical sciences and handicrafts, can make men invisible and lead them to hidden treasures, and answers every question formulated to him. He was also said to give to mortal beings the power over serpents.

Was mentioned as a co-signatory of a Diabolical pact with Urban Grandier.

According to Francis Barrett (c. 1801), Astaroth is the prince of accusers and inquisitors. In art, in the Dictionnaire Infernal (1818), Astaroth is depicted as a nude man with feathered wings, wearing a crown, holding a serpent in one hand, and riding a beast with dragon-like wings and a serpent-like tail.

Astaroth appears in the Science Fiction book, Monster Hunter International (book 1) by Larry Correia.

Appearances in film

Ashtaroth is one of three demons summoned by Faustus to attack Benvolio in Doctor Faustus.

The "Star of Astoroth" features prominently in the 1971 Disney film Bedknobs and Broomsticks, where it takes the form of a magical medallion.

Astaroth is named in the 1976 Hammer horror film To the Devil a Daughter.

In the 1920 silent horror film The Golem: How He Came into the World, Rabbi Loew and his assistant summon Astaroth to animate the Golem resulting in deadly and destructive results.

Astaroth also appears in the 2007 television series Blood Ties. Symbol appears in the first few episodes.

Astaroth symbolism is also prevalent in the 2018 movie Antrum: The Deadliest Film Ever Made and a symbol of Astaroth appears in the movie over 170 times.

The Solomonic seal of Astaroth makes an appearance in Pyewacket.

Astaroth is the title character in "Astaroth"/"Astaroth Female Demon", a film by the Brazilian director Larissa Anzoategui. The name of the company that made the film is also "Astaroth Produções"

Astaroth appears as the main antagonist of the movie RIPD2 (2022).

See also

 Asherah
 Atargatis

References

Sources
 S. L. MacGregor Mathers, A. Crowley, The Goetia: The Lesser Key of Solomon the King (1904). 1995 reprint: .

External links 
 
 

Astarte
Deities in the Hebrew Bible
Goetic demons
Qliphoth